Lepidophyma pajapanensis,  the Pajapan tropical night lizard, is a species of lizard in the family Xantusiidae. It is a small lizard found in Mexico. It is native to the coastal Sierra de los Tuxtlas, and to the southeast near Jesús Carranza on the Coatzacoalcos River in the Isthmus of Tehuantepec. It ranges from sea level up to 1,500 meters elevation.

References

Lepidophyma
Endemic reptiles of Mexico
Fauna of Los Tuxtlas
Reptiles described in 1957